Wang Dingliu is a fictional character in Water Margin, one of the Four Great Classical Novels in Chinese literature. Nicknamed "Living Goddess of Lightning", he ranks 104th among the 108 Stars of Destiny and 68th among the 72 Earthly Fiends.

Background
The novel depicts Wang Dingliu as having a pointed head, sparkling eyes and skinny legs. Nicknamed "Living Goddess of Lightning", he could walk at a very fast pace as if he were walking in air.

Wang Dingliu, who is a native of Jiankang Prefecture (present-day Nanjing, Jiangsu), runs an inn on the bank of the Yangtze River with his father. Although he has learnt many types of martial arts, he is skilled in none. However, he is a good swimmer.

Becoming an outlaw
Zhang Shun, on his way to Jiankang to fetch the physician An Daoquan to Liangshan to treat Song Jiang, who is severely ill, comes to the Yangtze and boards the boat of the pirate Zhang Wang. Midway across the river, Zhang Wang pounces on him when he is asleep, ties him up and throws him into the river. An expert swimmer, Zhang Shun frees himself underwater and gets to the opposite bank, where he finds the inn of Wang Dingliu. Wang's father rents him a room and introduces his son to him.

Zhang Shun finds An Daoquan, who agrees to go to Liangshan only after his persistent plea. That night An takes Zhang along when he visits a prostitute whom he is besotted with called Li Qiaonu. Zhang is worried that An is not willing to part from Li, who keeps plying the physician with drinks until he is drunk as a fiddler. Then he discovers that Zhang Wang, apparently also a patron of Li, calls on the woman. After the two disappeared into a room, Zhang Shun kills the mamasan and two servants of the brothel. Then he knocks on the door of Li's room and hacks her to death when she opens it. Zhang Wang, hearing the cry, gets away. Remembering what Wu Song did in Mengzhou, Zhang Shun writes with the blood of Li on the wall a supposed confession by An himself that he is the killer. When An wakes up, he has no choice but to go with Zhang Shun to Liangshan.

At Wang Dingliu's inn, Zhang Shun relates what has happened. Wang notices Zhang Wang is at the bank and asks him to ferry his two "relatives". When the boat is midstream, Zhang Shun, who has exchanged clothes with An Daoquan to deceive Zhang Wang, overcomes the boatman with the help of Wang. They tie him up and dump him into the river. Zhang Shun asks Wang to join Liangshan and the young man gladly agrees. 

When Song Jiang leads a force toward Dongping Prefecture (東平府; present-day Dongping County, Shandong) to seize its grain stock, Yu Baosi volunteers to go ahead first to persuade the prefect and Dong Ping, the city's military commander, not to resist. Wang Dingliu goes along with him. However, Dong Ping suggests executing the two to strike fear among the outlaws. Afraid that would deeply antagonise Liangshan, the prefect only has them beaten and thrown out. Liangshan captures Dongping and wins over Dong Ping.

Campaigns and death
Wang Dingliu is put in charge of an inn which acts as a lookout for Liangshan after the 108 Stars of Destiny came together in what is called the Grand Assembly. He participates in the campaigns against the Liao invaders and rebel forces within the Song Empire following amnesty from Emperor Huizong for Liangshan.

In the battle of Xuanzhou (宣州; present-day Xuancheng, Anhui) in the campaign against Fang La, Wang Dingliu is killed when being hit by a poisoned arrow.

Notes

References
 
 
 
 
 
 
 

72 Earthly Fiends
Fictional characters from Jiangsu